The 2020–21 First Women's Basketball League of Serbia is the 15th season of the First Women's Basketball League of Serbia, the highest professional basketball league in Serbia. Also, it's the 77th national championship played by Serbian clubs inclusive of the nation's previous incarnations as Yugoslavia and Serbia & Montenegro.

Crvena zvezda Kombank won its 32nd national championship.

Teams

Promotion and relegation
Teams promoted from the Second League
Spartak Subotica
Art Basket
Duga Šabac
Teams relegated to the Second League
Proleter 023

Venues and locations

Regular season

Standings

Playoffs 
Four teams were qualified for the Playoffs, as follows: Vojvodina 021, Crvena zvezda Kombank, Radivoj Korać, and Art Basket.

Bracket

Semifinals

|}

Finals

|}

See also
 2020–21 Milan Ciga Vasojević Cup
 2020–21 Basketball League of Serbia
 2020–21 WABA League

References

External links
 Official website
 League Standings at eurobasket.com
 League Standings at srbijasport.net

First Women's Basketball League of Serbia seasons
Serbia
Basketball